The Severed Hand is a 1914 silent film short drama directed by Wilfred Lucas and starring Cleo Madison, George Larkin and Edward Sloman. It was produced by Powers Picture Plays and distributed through Universal Film Manufacturing Company.

Cast
Cleo Madison - Nan Dawson
George Larkin - Dick Ralston
Edwin Alexander - Danny Dawson
Edward Sloman
Frank Lanning
William V. Mong - ?

References

External links
 The Severed Hand at IMDb.com

1914 films
Lost American films
American black-and-white films
Films directed by Wilfred Lucas